Miley is a feminine given name. It first entered the top 1,000 names used for newborn girls in the United States in 2007 and has continued to be well used. Spelling variants of the name in use include, among others, Milee, Mileigh, Mylee, Myleigh, and Mylie. Its popularity is attributed to the fame of singer-songwriter and actress Miley Cyrus (born Destiny Hope Cyrus), whose name originated as a childhood nickname given to her by her father because she was so "smiley". Cyrus starred as Miley Stewart on the Disney Channel sitcom Hannah Montana.

The popularity of the name also coincided with similar sounding names that also became fashionable for girls in the English-speaking world in the late 20th and early 21st centuries such as Kylie and Riley. 

Miley was also used as a masculine given name for a character named Miley Byrne played by Mick Lally in the Irish drama series Glenroe.

See also
Maile (disambiguation)

References

English given names
Feminine given names